Maurice Archambaud (30 August 1908 in Paris – 3 December 1955 in Le Raincy) was a French professional cyclist from 1932 to 1944. His short stature earned him the nickname of le nabot, or "the dwarf", but his colossal thighs made him an exceptional rider.

He won Paris-Soissons and Paris-Verneuil as an amateur in 1931 and turned professional the following year for Alcyon, one of the top teams in France. He won the inaugural Grand Prix des Nations in his first season.

He set the world hour record at 45.767 km at the Vigorelli velodrome in Milan on 3 November 1937. He beat the Dutchman, Frans Slaats' record of 45.485 km, set on 29 September 1937. The record stood for five years before being beaten by Fausto Coppi.

Archambaud rode for France in the Tour de France between the wars. His sudden changes of form and frequent falls meant that he never won the race, but he did win ten stages  and wear the yellow jersey.

He won a shorter stage race, Paris–Nice, in 1936 and 1939.

Major results

1932
 Grand Prix des Nations: winner
1933
 Tour de France:
 Winner stages 1 and 11
 5th overall
 9 days in the yellow jersey
1935
 Tour de France:
Winner stages 5A and 14B
7th overall
 Giro d'Italia:
 Winner stage 14B
 Paris-Caen
 Six days of Paris
GP de l'Echo d'Alger
1936
 Tour de France:
Winner stage 4
5 days in the yellow jersey.
 Paris–Nice
1937
 Tour de France:
Winner stage 2
 Hour record
 Giro della provincia Milano (with Aldo Bini)
1939
 Tour de France:
 Winner stages 10B, 10C, 12B and 17B
 Paris–Nice

References

External links 

French male cyclists
French Tour de France stage winners
French Giro d'Italia stage winners
1908 births
1955 deaths
Cyclists from Paris